Erik Lester Eriksson (16 November 1942 – 26 October 2021) was a Swedish freestyle swimmer who won two bronze relay medals at the 1966 European Aquatics Championships. He competed at the 1964 and 1968 Summer Olympics in seven events with the best achievement of fifth-eighth place in the 4 × 200 m freestyle relay.

References

1942 births
2021 deaths
Swimmers from Stockholm
Swedish male freestyle swimmers
Swimmers at the 1964 Summer Olympics
Swimmers at the 1968 Summer Olympics
Olympic swimmers of Sweden
European Aquatics Championships medalists in swimming
SK Neptun swimmers